Elmar Rähn (3 December 1904 – 3 January 1996) was an Estonian athlete. He competed in the men's decathlon at the 1924 Summer Olympics. In 1944, during World War II, Rähn fled to Germany and then emigrated to Australia in 1947 where he worked as a sports instructor.

References

External links
 

1904 births
1996 deaths
Athletes from Tallinn
People from the Governorate of Estonia
Estonian decathletes
Olympic athletes of Estonia
Athletes (track and field) at the 1924 Summer Olympics
Estonian World War II refugees
Estonian emigrants to Australia
Olympic decathletes